Mati Kadulu is a 2021 Sri Lankan thriller teledrama broadcast on Jathika Rupavahini. The series is directed and written by Nimal Rathnayake. It is produced by Deshamanya Gaya Ekanayaka and music direction is by Gayan Ganakadara. The serial stars Sarath Kothalawala and Michelle Dilhara in lead roles along with Jayasekara Aponsu, Jehan Appuhami, Ajith Lokuge and Udayanthi Kulathunga make supportive roles.

The telecasting starts on Rupavahini from Mondays to Thursdays at 9 pm from 11 January 2021. The serial became very popular after telecasting first few episodes.

Plot
Kisaa, a high school dropout, is mentally accused when she was found pregnant with a dancing sir who had done ten marriages before. This creates a clash between Kisaa and his wife. The collide continues when Kisaa finds that he has neglect his theories besides the law in accordance to kill her with the cinnamon arc with her. The cinnamon represents pain while the condom represents sex.

Cast and characters
 Sarath Kothalawala as Sekara 
 Michelle Dilhara as Kisa 
 Jayasekara Aponsu as Wilson 
 Ajith Lokuge as Chandralal 
 Udayanthi Kulathunga as Swarna 
 Jehan Appuhami as Buddhika 
 Wasanthi Ranwala as Asoka 
 Melani Asoka as Sheela 
 Anjana Premarathna as Rupasinghe 
 Anuradha Edirisinghe as Heen Menika
 Pavithra Wickramasinghe as Seetha  
 Rangi Rajapaksha as Raekani  
 Sisira Thadikara as Scary man 
 Chamikara Bokaregoda as Scary man's worker 
 Sampath Athaudha as Sandun 
 Ranil Prasad as Sarath 
 Gaya Ekanayaka as Police Officer
 Sunil Dissanayake as Exocist 
 Anton Cooray as Heen Menika's father

References 

Sri Lankan television shows
2021 Sri Lankan television series debuts
Sri Lanka Rupavahini Corporation original programming